The Năruja is a left tributary of the river Zăbala in Romania. It discharges into the Zăbala in the village Năruja. It flows through the villages Brădetu, Valea Neagră, Vetrești-Herăstrău, Nistorești and Năruja.

References

Rivers of Romania
Rivers of Vrancea County